is the 28th single by the Japanese female idol group Cute, released in Japan on October 28, 2015.

Release 
It is a double-A-sided single.

It was released in six versions: four limited ones (limited editions A, B, C, and D) and two regular ones (regular editions A and B). Both regular editions were CD-only, while all the limited editions included an additional DVD.

Reception 
The physical CD single debuted at number 2 in the Oricon daily singles chart.

In the Oricon weekly singles chart, it debuted also at number 2.

According to Oricon, it was the 87th most selling CD single of the whole year 2015 in Japan.

Track listing

Limited Editions A and C, Regular Edition A

Limited Editions B and D, Regular Edition B

Charts

Year-end charts

References

External links 
 Profile of the single on the Hello! Project official website
 Profile of the single on the Up-Front Works official website

2015 singles
Japanese-language songs
Cute (Japanese idol group) songs
Zetima Records singles
2015 songs
Song articles with missing songwriters